is a Japanese anime television series produced by Sunrise. The series premiered from September 30 to December 23, 2018. The production team features some of the staff who worked on the Tiger & Bunny series.

Plot
In the city-state Lisvaletta, while people go about their tranquil everyday lives, crimes and illegal drugs run rampant. Above all, a dangerous, highly-fatal drug named "Anthem" is casting a dark shadow on the streets. The "Seven-O" special criminal investigation unit whose speciality is to supervise the investigation of Anthem, institutes a "Double Decker System" policy of forming groups of two investigators, and all members are given nicknames.

One team consists of the veteran investigator Doug Billingham accompanied by the rookie Kirill Vrubel. This unconventional duo combines an aloof veteran detective who is hard to get a read on, and an inexperienced detective who is a little too eager.

Characters

Seven-O
A special department of Lisvaletta's narcotics division focused on dealing with Anthem trafficking, serving directly under the military.

  / "Veteran"
 
 The most experienced member of Seven-O. Doug is a skilled professional in the field, but also displays a laid back, deadpan demeanor. He insists on exclusively using .38 caliber handguns because he considers them detective's weapons. His personal vehicle is a modified sports car resembling a DMC DeLorean that is loaded with gadgets and is able to assume a high-speed mode. His signature color is red.

  / "Perm" / "Okappa" / "Buzz-Cut"
 
 Doug Billingham's new rookie partner, a 20-year-old former police constable with dreams of becoming a hero. Kirill is impulsive, cocky, and dense, contrasting with his partner's cooler personality, with his philosophy for life being "don't think, feel so good." Kirill's "good luck charm" saying is later revealed to be an excerpt of a poem known as "Nikai's Prayer." Despite his seeming idiocy, Kirill is surprisingly knowledgeable in the field of genetics, having written a detailed scientific paper on the subject as a teenager to earn a scholarship. He is often confused for a woman because of his slender build and androgynous face. His signature color is purple. All of his nicknames so far have referred to his hairstyle in some manner.

  / "Pink"
 
 Seven-O's resident sniper, displaying a somewhat rude and blunt personality and partnered with Katherine. Deana is fiercely independent and quick to break protocol to solve a case, often clashing with her partner's strict insistence on following the rules. Her signature color is pink.

  / "Rookie"
 
 A relatively "normal" woman compared to the rest of the team, with her most eccentric trait being that she is an avid foodie, Katherine is the latest rookie in Seven-O (beating Kirill by a single day), partnered with Deana. The two frequently clash over their opposing personalities, with Kay finding Deana's casual dismissal of rules and protocol exasperating. Her signature color is green.

  / "Boxer"
 
 An aggressive and tomboyish Seven-O inspector partnered with Yuri. In her youth, Max was a shy, bookish, and feminine girl who enjoyed crafts and cute things. She adopted her current look as a favor to her transgender friend Connor, who came out at their high school prom and was shunned by their schoolmates, turning to drugs and disappearing after being denied entry. Despite becoming colder and more bitter since then, Max retains many domestic hobbies, including cooking and taking care of plants. Yuri notes that despite her "tough girl" exterior, Max is still warm and gentle at heart. Her personal vehicle is a bulky, futuristic motorcycle. Her signature color is blue.

  / "Robot"
 
 An inspector in Seven-O partnered with Max, displaying a calm and logical, yet warm and friendly personality in contrast to her partner's brasher attitude. Yuri, befitting her nickname, is actually a highly advanced android imbued with incredible strength and computational abilities, a fact that is open knowledge to everyone in the department but Kirill. The department keeps this a secret from him solely to mess with him, finding his attempts to keep her "secret" entertaining. Her signature color is white.

  / "Boss"
 
 The head of Seven-O, a somewhat eccentric man who seems to pick members of his team based on arbitrary quirks. He considers the four female inspectors and Sophie to be "Travis' Angels," a name they all find demeaning and sexist.

 
 
 Seven-O's dispatcher, a young woman who dresses in lolita fashion and behaves in a "cute," childish manner. Her signature color is orange.

  / "Doctor"
 
 Seven-O's resident technology expert. Apple insists on being referred to as "Doctor" (though this is usually ignored by everyone in the department but Kirill) and is in charge of creating and maintaining all of the team's equipment.

Esperanza
A powerful Anthem-related criminal organization and the main antagonists of the series.

  / "Z."
 
 The leader of Esperanza. At first thought to be the lowest member on the organization's A-to-Z hierarchy, it is soon revealed that Zabel is actually the organization's true leader. He murders Agepetus Kroyd, the man thought to be Esperanza's boss, in a plot to throw off law enforcement. Zabel despises those who waste food, demanding his subordinates finish a meal completely before leaving the table.

  / "B."
 
 A high-ranking member of the criminal organization Esperanza. Bamboo Man dresses in a clown-like outfit with rubies replacing his teeth and possesses incredible superhuman abilities that do not come from Anthem usage, including enhanced strength and speed and the ability to change his face. Bamboo Man is later revealed to have assumed the identity of Brian Cooper, a high-ranking member of the Lisvaletta military.

  / "A."
 The assumed leader of Esperanza, who is killed by Zabel Franken, Esperanza's true leader, in a plot to throw off law enforcement.

Other characters
 
 
 Doug's former partner. He retires from the police after recovering from being shot on a case to open his own bar. He is noted to not be very good at running the bar, serving patrons canned and frozen food and having no customers beyond Seven-O's inspectors.

 
 
 Kirill's older brother who works at Derick's bar. For most of Kirill's life, Valery cross-dressed and posed as his sister under the name "Milla," his secret only being exposed when Kirill stumbles upon him in the men's restroom of Derick's bar. The deception is revealed to be because Valery and Kirill are escapees from Nikai (Japanese for "second floor"), the second and brighter sun in Lisvaletta's sky. Valery-as-Milla walking out of Kirill's life and disappearing ten years ago became Kirill's inspiration to join the police force.

 
 
 Secretary of the Lisvalletta military, who is in fact and native of Nikai and a Genetically Modified Soldiers (GMS). He is aware of Kirill and Valery's past as natives of Nikai and Kirill's ability to provide an antidote to Anthem.

Anthem Users
Users of the drug Anthem are split into three separate phases: Phase 1 – suspected usage, Phase 2 – Accelerating usage and Phase 3 – Anthem-induced Overdrive. The Seven-O cannot intervene until they determine a users has entered Phase 2 when they develop a distinguishing mark on their neck, and once users enter Phase 3, they can mutate and gain superhuman powers. Users can also attain an even more dangerous transformation via overdose.

Nikai
Nikai is the name give to the planet's second sun which is in fact a human space colony set up by its human inhabitants who left a wasted planet many years ago seeking a new home. This culminated in a different civilization which developed Genetically Modified Soldiers (GMS), but found the process time-consuming and expensive. A miniaturized and portable version of the active drug was then developed and given the name Anthem, and the Esperanza organization was selected to distribute it on the planet's surface while the military retained the antidote.

Media

Anime
The 13-episode anime series was announced on January 4, 2018, titled Double Decker! Doug & Kirill, and premiered from September 30 to December 23, 2018 on Tokyo MX and other channels. The series is directed by Joji Furuta and produced by Ryo Ando, with animation by studio Sunrise and forms part of the Tiger & Bunny project. Tomohiro Suzuki returned to produce the series' scripts. Masakazu Katsura returned to handle character designs. Norihiro Itagaki returned to handle animation character design. Yuki Hayashi composes the music. The opening theme is "Stereo to Monologue" by KiRiSaMe, and the ending theme is "Buntline Special" by Vickeblanka. The series was simulcasted on Crunchyroll, with Funimation producing an English dub as it aired. A three-episode anime titled Extra Story was released on February 10, March 10 and April 10, 2019.

Episodes

Extra Story
Three "Extra" episodes were released in 2019. The first was set between Episodes 4 and 5, the second was set between Episodes 8 and 9, and the third was set after Episode 13.

Manga
A manga adaptation illustrated by Mizuki Sakakibara ran on Shueisha Tonari no Young Jump website and the YanJan! app from October 1, 2018 to March 30, 2020. Four tankōbon volumes were published from December 19, 2018 to April 17, 2020.

Notes

References

External links
 
 

2018 anime television series debuts
Action anime and manga
Anime with original screenplays
Funimation
Medialink
Seinen manga
Shueisha manga
Sunrise (company)
Tokyo MX original programming